Haikou railway station is the northern terminal of the Hainan eastern ring high-speed railway, the Hainan western ring high-speed railway, and the Hainan western ring railway. It is located a few hundred metres southeast of South Port, the Hainan terminal of the Guangdong–Hainan railway, in the far western suburbs of Haikou City.

When ferries containing railway cars arrive from Zhanjiang, Guangdong at the South Port, railway cars are unloaded from the ferries onto tracks. An engine car attaches to these passenger cars. This then travels to the Haikou railway station. There, the passengers exit the railway cars and leave through the station. They may also connect to the Hainan eastern ring high-speed railway. Train cars carrying cargo also use this ferry service. These cars travel through the Haikou railway station, onto the Hainan western ring railway, to other locations in Hainan, such as Dongfang.

Administratively, the station is within Changliu Town, in Xiuying District of Haikou City.

External links

Railway stations in Hainan
Buildings and structures in Haikou
Ferry terminals in China